The Kosovo Security Force Band is a music group from the partially recognized Republic of Kosovo. It is the only one within the country's Security Forces and follows the Albanian and even Serbian band precedent and format. The Kosovan FSK Band was founded in 2003 as part of the country's Protection Corps until it was transferred to the FSK in 2009. In 2014, distinctive ceremonial uniforms were authorized. It performs on all public holidays in the republic, including Independence Day, Constitution Day and Europe Day. It coordinates with the FSK Ceremonial Guard to participate in ceremonial events. It has performed jointly with bands from NATO, the United States National Guard and the European Union.

See also
Serbian Guards Unit Band
Albanian Armed Forces Band
Honour Guard Company (Montenegro)

External links
IMAZH - ORKESTRA FRYMORE E FSK SË 10.04.2017

References

Military bands
Military of Kosovo
Military units and formations established in 2003
Musical groups established in 2003
2003 establishments in Kosovo